is a town located in Ashikita District (葦北郡, Ashikita-gun), Kumamoto, Japan.

Ashikita is situated on the south west coast of the island of Kyushu in Southern Japan, and it is known for its attractive coastlines, beaches and its production of citrus fruit.

Ashikita is famous for its fresh local produce, in particular dekopon oranges (also known as shiranui), and amanatsu oranges. It also has iconic sailboats called utasebune (打たせ船) which fish for famous cutlassfish (太刀魚 tachiuo) and red-footed shrimp (足赤海老 ashiaka ebi). Other local delicacies include Ashikita beef, Otachimisaki salt, Ozeki rice and Ozeki shochu (sake).

Geography 
Ashikita Town is located approximately 60 km southwest of Kumamoto City.

Historically, Ashikita was located in the Higo Domain (肥後国, Higo-kuni) of Kyushu. Modern Ashikita Town was created by merging the old towns of Tanoura and Ashikita, and the villages of Ono and Yoshio.

The town is bordered to the north by Yatsushiro City (八代市 Yatsushiro-shi). To the south lie Tsunagi Town (津奈木町 Tsunagi-machi) and Minamata City (水俣市 Minamata-shi) and to the east runs the Kuma river (球磨川 Kuma-gawa), separating Ashikita from Kuma Village (球磨村 Kuma-mura) and Hitoyoshi City (人吉市 Hitoyoshi-shi).

The municipality governs the 7th largest area within the prefecture.

Climate 
Ashikita, like all regions of Kumamoto, experiences large differences in temperature, from an average high in August of 33 degrees celsius (the 3rd highest average in Japan), to an average low in January of 0 degrees. In addition, Kumamoto Prefecture as a whole sees the most rainfall on the island of Kyushu, particularly during the rainy season between June and July. Like most of Japan, Ashikita experiences all four seasons, including cherry blossoms from late March to April, and Autumn colors from November or December depending on the warmth of the weather.

Typhoon season generally occurs between August and September, and typhoons occasionally reach Ashikita, though they often make landfall over Miyazaki or Kagoshima Prefectures to the south.

(Data from NOAA: https://www.ncdc.noaa.gov/)

Areas within Ashikita 
Ashikita is divided into 44 areas. Communities are often spread along rivers, following the Kuma River between Yatsushiro City and Hitoyoshi City, and following the many streams that originate in Ashikita's mountains and flow out into the Yatsushiro Sea, along the town's extensive coastline. These areas include:

 Northern Tanoura region along the coast
Kami-Tanoura (上田浦) and Hatato (波多島) serviced by Kami-Tanoura Station on the Hisatsu Orange Railway.
 Kodanoura (小田浦) serviced by Higo-Tanoura Station on the Hisatsu Orange Railway.
 Imuta (井牟田)
 Central Tanoura region
 Tanouramachi (田浦町) and Tanoura (田浦) which can be accessed by the Tanoura IC, or by the Hisatsu Orange Railway from Otachimisaki Koen Station. Otachimisaki Park is located on the cape, with beaches, Otachimisaki Onsen, Ashikita Symbol Tower and recreational facilities. Tanoura Rest Area offers a food shop and restaurant for travelers. Tanoura Elementary School and Tanoura Junior High School can be found there.

Mountainous region east of Tanoura

 Oiwa (大岩) and Kuroiwa (黒岩)
 Tachikawa (立川), Yokoigi (横居木) and Uwabara (上原)
 Region along the Kuma River
 Yoshio (吉尾) and Ebirase (箙瀬) serviced by Yoshio Station along the JR Hisatsu Line; Yoshio Elementary School and Yoshio Onsen are located there.
 Kaiji (海路) serviced by Kaiji Station on the JR Hisatsu Line; the location of Kaiji Elementary School.
 Ono (大野) and Tsuge (告) - Ono Onsen Center offers an onsen, food shop and restaurant along the road to Hitoyoshi City. Ono Elementary School is located there.

 Northern Ashikita region 
 Michigawachi (道川内), Fushiki (伏木氏), Matsubae (松生), Onita (大尼田) and Shiroishi (白石) with Shiroishi Station along the JR Hisatsu Line
 Otojiya (乙千屋) where Ashikita High School is located.
 Western Ashikita region
 Uminoura (海浦) serviced by Uminoura Station on the Hisatsu Orange Railway
Hakariishi (計石) and Tsurugiyama (鶴木山) with Ebi-An shrimp restaurant, Ashikita Utasebune sailing fishing boat docks, Ashikita Total Seaside Park, Tsurugiyama Swimming Beach and Ashikita Youth Center

 Central Ashikita region
 Hanaoka (花岡)
 Sashiki (佐敷) is accessible by the Ashikita IC, and has the Ashikita Farmers' Market Dekopon Rest Area, where travelers can buy fresh produce and local delicacies. Sashiki Station lies along the Hisatsu Orange Railway, and on nearby Shiroyama Hill sit the Shiroyama Skydome and the Sashiki Castle Ruins Historical Park. Sashiki Elementary School and Sashiki Junior High School are also located here.
 Ashikita (芦北) is the location of the Ashikita Town Hall and the Bayside Ashikita area, where a park and a wooden boulevard can be found.

 Southern Ashikita region
 Yunoura (湯浦) is a residential area along the Yunoura river, serviced by Yunoura Station along the Hisatsu Orange Railway. It has both Yunoura Elementary School and Yunoura Junior High School. Yunoura Onsen and Healthy Park pool and onsen can also be found there.
 Meshima (女島) has the Meshima Yumemoyai Center.
 Eastern Ashikita mountainous region
 Amatsuki (天月), Shiraki (白木), Ichinose (市野瀬), Kuwabara (桑原), Shioshitashi (塩浸), Miyanoura (宮浦) and Yahata (八幡).
 Region east of Yunoura
 Tagawa (田川), Miyazaki (宮﨑) and Toyooka (豊岡)
 Okawachi (大川内) where Uchino Elementary School is located.
 Region south of Ono
 Yoneda (米田), Takaoka (高岡), Furuishi (古石), Kunimi (国見) and Maruyama (丸山).

Governance 
Municipal Government

 Mayor: Kazunari Takezaki (instated 23 January 2005, 3rd term as mayor)
 Town Council Members: 16 in total (elected until 2014)

History 
During the Sengoku Period (1467-1615), the Ashikita region was located within the Higo Domain, which also contained the areas of present-day Yatsushiro and Kuma.

Sashiki Area, located in the heart of Ashikita Town, was part of the Kuma Road that connected Kuma, South Kumamoto with Edo (modern-day Tokyo) during the Edo period, and was lined with inns and rest houses, though in present day Ashikita this is no longer the case.

Modern History 

 1 April 1889: The following villages were established in accordance with the Town and Villages Act: Ashikita-gun Sashiki Village, Ono Village, Yoshio Village, Yunoura Village, Tanoura Village
 18 November 1903: Sashiki Village becomes Sashiki Town
 1 October 1951: Yunoura Village becomes Yunoura Town
 1 January 1955: Sashiki Town, Ono Village and Yoshio Village are merged to create Ashikita Town
 1 April 1958: Tanoura Village becomes Tanoura Town
 1 November 1970: Ashikita Town and Yunoura Town are merged to form Ashikita Town
 1 January 2005: Ashikita Town and Tanoura Town are merged  in accordance with the New Town Act to form Ashikita Town

Economy 

 Fishing is plentiful, particularly specialist fishing on sail boats called utasebune (打瀬船)
 Agriculture is focussed particularly on plentiful citrus fruits
 The farming of amanatsu (甘夏) citrus fruit began in old Tanoura Town in 1949. It has become the largest producer of amanatsu fruit in Japan
 Currently, the production of citrus fruit known as shiranui (不知火) or dekopon (デコポン) is increasing

Famous Products 

 Dekopon fruit
 Amanatsu fruit
 Ozeki rice
 Ozeki beef
 Ashikita shochu (sake)
 Tachiuo fish (cutlass fish)
 Ashiakaebi shrimp (red-footed shrimp)

Transport

Roads 
Highways:

 Minami-Kyushu Expressway: Tanoura IC, Ashikita IC leading to Kumamoto City and Fukuoka City to the north, and to Minamata City in the south.

National roads:

 National 3rd road
 National 219th road

Major prefectural roads:

 Kumamoto 27th Ashikita-Kuma Line
 Kumamoto 56th Minamata Line

Highway rest areas (道の駅 michi-no-eki)

 Tanoura Michi-no-eki
 Ashikita Dekopon Michi-no-eki
Ono Onsen Center [along the Ashikita-Kuma Line]

Trains 
Kyushu Railway Company

 Hisatsu Line: Kaiji Station, Yoshio Station, Shiraishi Station
 The Kyushu Shinkansen bullet train runs between Shin-Yatsushiro Station (新八代駅 shin-yatsushiro eki) and Shin-Minamata Station (新水俣駅 shin-minamata eki), passing through tunnels across Ashikita.

Hisatsu Orange Railway

 Hisatsu Orange Railway Line: Kamitanoura Station, Tanoura Otachimisaki-koen Station, Higo-Tanoura Station, Uminoura Station, Sashiki Station, Yunoura Station

Buses 
Sanko Bus (産交バス)

 Tanoura - Ashikita - Tsunagi Town - Minamata City

Fureai Tsukuru Bus (ふれあいツクールバス)

Operates Mon~Sat, except for holidays. ¥200 flat fare.

① Ashikita Town Hall to Shiraishi, Oiwa

② Michi-no-Eki Ashikita Dekopon to Furuishi

③ Michi-no-Eki Ashikita Dekopon to Hyakki and Nagasaki

④ Ashikita Town Hall to Ono Onsen Center

⑤ Ashikita Town Hall to Tagawa

⑥ Ashikita Town Hall to Tsurugiyama Swimming Beach and Ashikita Youth Center

⑦ Michi-no-Eki Ashikita Dekopon to Meshima

⑧ Uwabara to Kaiji Station

⑨ Ashikita Town Hall to Michi-no-Eki Tanoura, Otachimisaki Onsen and Yokoigi (Mon & Thurs only)

⑩ Ashikita Town Hall to Michi-no-Eki Tanoura, Otachimisaki Onsen and Kami Imuta (Tues & Fri only)

⑪ Ashikita Town Hall to Michi-no-Eki Tanoura, Otachimisaki Onsen and Sugisako (Wed, Sat only)

The Fureai Tsukuru Bus Service is run by the Ashikita Town Hall. Many routes pass through the town hall, Sashiki Station, Michi-no-Eki Dekopon and Yunoura Station. To disembark at more remote areas, passengers should inform the driver of their destination when they board, and can request that they stop when it is safe.

Airport Access 
Aso-Kumamoto Airport can be accessed by car, using one of the airport's carparking companies. Alternatively, by taking a train to Yatsushiro Station or Shin-Yatsushiro Station, passengers can change to the Super Banpeiyu Bus service from either station, which stops in front of the airport.

Fukuoka International Airport can be accessed by bullet train from Shin-Yatsushiro Station or Shin-Minamata Station

Education 
High Schools:

 Ashikita High School (熊本県立芦北高等学校)

Junior High Schools:

 Tanoura Junior High School (田浦中学校)
 Sashiki Junior High School (佐敷中学校)
 Yunoura Junior High School (湯浦中学校)

Elementary Schools:

 Tanoura Elementary School (田浦小学校)
 Sashiki Elementary School (佐敷小学校)
 Ono Elementary School (大野小学校)
 Kaiji Elementary School (海路小学校)
 Yunoura Elementary School (湯浦小学校)
 Uchino Elementary School (内野小学校)

Special needs schools:

 Ashikita special needs school (熊本県立芦北支援学校) (for students with disabilities)

Tourism and Landmarks 
Tourist Spots

 Utasebune fishing boat tours
 Sashiki Castle Ruins
 Otachimisaki Park Beach
 Ashikita Marine Park Beach
 Ashikita Hoshino Tomihiro Art Museum - sister museum to Midori City Hoshino Tomihiro Art Museum
 Sekishokan (赤松館) cultural heritage site
 Nozaka Bay
 Sashiki Suwa Jinja Shrine
 Yunoura Suwa Jinja Shrine
 Tanoura Aso Jinja Shrine

Festivals and Events 
As of April 2019:

 April: Yunoura Suwa Jinja Shrine Festival, Sashiki Suwa Jinja Shrine Festival
 May: Golf Tournament
 June: Volleyball Tournament, Table Tennis Tournament
 July: Ashikita Summer Festival Celebrations, Bowling Tournament, Clay Pigeon Shooting Tournament, Softball Tournament, Croquet Tournament, Sports Festival
 August: Ashikita Summer Festival Celebrations, Town Dance and Fireworks Display, Baseball Tournament, Swimming Tournament, Badminton Tournament, Beach Volleyball Tournament
 September: Golf Tournament
 October: Ashikita International Festival, Athletics Tournament, Moon Viewing Festival Noh Performance
 November: Ashikita Culture Festival
 December:
 January: New Year shrine celebrations, Ashikita Town School Music Festival
 February: Utase-hai Junior Karate Competition, Ashikita Marathon, Ashikita Utasebune Festival
 March: Dekopon Festival, Ashikita Utase Marathon

See also 
 2020 Kyushu floods

References

External links 

Ashikita official website 
 :ja:芦北町
Kouhou Ashikita town circular

Towns in Kumamoto Prefecture